Żabnica  (German Mönchskappe) is a village in the administrative district of Gmina Gryfino, within Gryfino County, West Pomeranian Voivodeship, in north-western Poland, close to the German border.

The village has a population of 420.

References

Villages in Gryfino County